Ministry of Jal Shakti is a ministry under Government of India which was formed in May 2019 under the second Modi ministry. This was formed by merging of two ministries; Ministry of Water Resources, River Development & Ganga Rejuvenation and Ministry of Drinking Water and Sanitation.

The formation of this ministry reflects India's seriousness towards the mounting water challenges the country has been facing over the past few decades. WAPCOS is an Indian multinational government undertaking and consultancy firm wholly owned by Ministry of Jal Shakti, Government of India. Former managing director of WAPCOS is RK Gupta.

Functions

The ministry was incorporated with an aim to clean the river Ganges. They would also encompass any international or national disputes between inter-state water bodies and the rivers which are shared by India along with other neighboring countries. A special project "Namami Gange" project has been launched to clean Ganga and its tributaries to provide safe drinking water to people of the country. The ministry has also launched its special campaigns on social so that citizens of the country become aware of water conservation.

Ministers

List of Ministers of State

References 

Government ministries of India
Ministry of Water Resources (India)
Ministries established in 2019